Division No. 14 is one of eighteen census divisions in the province of Saskatchewan, Canada, as defined by Statistics Canada. It is located on the northern portion of Southeast Saskatchewan, bordering Manitoba. The most populous community in this division is the city of Melfort. Other important communities are the towns of Nipawin and Tisdale.

Demographics 

Census subdivisions 
The following census subdivisions (municipalities or municipal equivalents) are located within Saskatchewan's Division No. 14.

Cities
Melfort

Towns
Arborfield
Carrot River
Choiceland
Hudson Bay
Kelvington
Naicam
Nipawin
Porcupine Plain
Rose Valley
Star City
Tisdale

Villages

Archerwill
Aylsham
Bjorkdale
Codette
Fosston
Love
Mistatim
Pleasantdale
Ridgedale
Smeaton
Spalding
Valparaiso
Weekes
White Fox
Zenon Park

Resort villages
Tobin Lake

Rural municipalities

 RM No. 366 Kelvington
 RM No. 367 Ponass Lake
 RM No. 368 Spalding
 RM No. 394 Hudson Bay
 RM No. 395 Porcupine
 RM No. 397 Barrier Valley
 RM No. 398 Pleasantdale
 RM No. 426 Bjorkdale
 RM No. 427 Tisdale
 RM No. 428 Star City
 RM No. 456 Arborfield
 RM No. 457 Connaught
 RM No. 458 Willow Creek
 RM No. 486 Moose Range
 RM No. 487 Nipawin
 RM No. 488 Torch River

Indian reserves
Carrot River 29A
Kinistin 91
Opaskwayak Cree Nation 27A (formerly Carrot River 27A)
Red Earth 29
Shoal Lake 28A
Yellow Quill 90

See also 
List of census divisions of Saskatchewan
List of communities in Saskatchewan

References

Division No. 14, Saskatchewan Statistics Canada

 
14